Kang Mi-suk (born September 25, 1968) is a wheelchair curler from South Korea, and is on the South Korean wheelchair curling team. Her lower part of the body was paralysed due to an blood vessel abnormality with unknown causes. She participated at the 2014 Winter Paralympics, and 2010 Winter Paralympics, winning a silver medal.

References

External links 

Profile at the Official Website for the 2010 Winter Paralympics in Vancouver

1968 births
Living people
South Korean wheelchair curlers
Paralympic wheelchair curlers of South Korea
Wheelchair curlers at the 2010 Winter Paralympics
Place of birth missing (living people)
Medalists at the 2010 Winter Paralympics
Paralympic silver medalists for South Korea
Paralympic medalists in wheelchair curling